Burlington High School is a public high school in Burlington, Wyoming, United States. The school is part of Big Horn County School District #1.  The mascot is the huskies.  It is a 1A sized school for Wyoming athletics.

Schools in Big Horn County, Wyoming
Public high schools in Wyoming